Flattening the curve was a public health strategy to slow down the spread of the SARS-CoV-2 virus during the early stages of the COVID-19 pandemic. The curve being flattened is the epidemic curve, a visual representation of the number of infected people needing health care over time. During an epidemic, a health care system can break down when the number of people infected exceeds the capability of the health care system's ability to take care of them. Flattening the curve means slowing the spread of the epidemic so that the peak number of people requiring care at a time is reduced, and the health care system does not exceed its capacity. Flattening the curve relies on mitigation techniques such as hand washing, use of face masks and social distancing.

A complementary measure is to increase health care capacity, to "raise the line". As described in an article in The Nation, "preventing a health care system from being overwhelmed requires a society to do two things: 'flatten the curve'—that is, slow the rate of infection so there aren't too many cases that need hospitalization at one time—and 'raise the line'—that is, boost the hospital system's capacity to treat large numbers of patients." During 2020, in the early stages of the COVID-19 pandemic, two key measures were to increase the numbers of available ICU beds and ventilators, which were in systemic shortage.

Experts differentiate between "zero-COVID", which is an elimination strategy taken by China, and "flattening the curve", a mitigation strategy that attempts to lessen the effects of the virus on society as much as possible, but still tolerates low levels of transmission within the community. These two initial strategies can be pursued sequentially or simultaneously during the acquired immunity phase through natural and vaccine-induced immunity.

Background 
Warnings about the risk of pandemics were repeatedly made throughout the 2000s and the 2010s by major international organisations including the World Health Organization (WHO) and the World Bank, especially after the 2002–2004 SARS outbreak. Governments, including those in the United States and France, both prior to the 2009 swine flu pandemic, and during the decade following the pandemic, both strengthened their health care capacities and then weakened them. At the time of the COVID-19 pandemic, health care systems in many countries were functioning near their maximum capacities.

In a situation like this, when a sizable new epidemic emerges, a portion of infected and symptomatic patients create an increase in the demand for health care that has only been predicted statistically, without the start date of the epidemic nor the infectivity and lethality known in advance. If the demand surpasses the capacity line in the infections per day curve, then the existing health facilities cannot fully handle the patients, resulting in higher death rates than if preparations had been made.

An influential UK study showed that an unmitigated COVID-19 response in the UK could have required up to 46 times the number of available ICU beds. One major public health management challenge is to keep the epidemic wave of incoming patients needing material and human health care resources supplied in a sufficient amount that is considered medically justified.

Flattening the curve 

Non-pharmaceutical interventions such as hand washing, social distancing, isolation and disinfection reduce the daily infections, therefore flattening the epidemic curve. A successfully flattened curve spreads health care needs over time and the peak of hospitalizations under the health care capacity line. Doing so, resources, be it material or human, are not exhausted and lacking. In hospitals, it for medical staff to use the proper protective equipment and procedures, but also to separate contaminated patients and exposed workers from other populations to avoid patient-to-doctor or patient-to-patient spreading.

Raising the line 
Along with the efforts to flatten the curve is the need for a parallel effort to "raise the line", to increase the capacity of the health care system. Healthcare capacity can be raised by raising equipment, staff, providing telemedicine, home care and health education to the public. Elective procedures can be cancelled to free equipment and staffs. Raising the line aims to provide adequate medical equipment and supplies for more patients.

During the COVID-19 pandemic 

The concept was popular during the early months of the COVID-19 pandemic.

According to Vox, in order to move away from social distancing and return to normal, the US needs to flatten the curve by isolation and mass testing, and to raise the line. Vox encourages building up health care capability including mass testing, software and infrastructures to trace and quarantine infected people, and scaling up cares including by resolving shortages in personal protection equipment, face masks.

According to The Nation, territories with weak finances and health care capacity such as Puerto Rico face an uphill battle to raise the line, and therefore a higher imperative pressure to flatten the curve.

In March 2020, UC Berkeley Economics and Law professor Aaron Edlin commented that ongoing massive efforts to flatten the curve supported by trillions dollars emergency package should be matched by equal efforts to raise the line and increase health care capacity. Edlin called for an activation of the Defense Production Act to order manufacturing companies to produce the needed sanitizers, personal protective equipment, ventilators, and set up hundreds thousands to millions required hospital beds. Standing in March 2020 estimates, Edlin called for the construction of 100-300 emergency hospitals to face what he described as "the largest health catastrophe in 100 years" and to adapt health care legislation preventing emergency practices needed in time of pandemics. Edlin pointed out proposed stimulus package as oriented toward financial panics, while not providing sufficient funding for the core issue of a pandemic: health care capability.

By 2021, the phrase "flatten the curve" had largely fallen out of medical messaging etymology.

See also 

 SIR model
 Basic reproduction number (R0)
 Quarantine
 Imperial College COVID-19 Response Team
 List of countries by hospital beds

References 

Epidemiology
Responses to the COVID-19 pandemic